The San Silvestre Vallecana is an annual 10 km road race held on 31 December in Madrid, Spain since 1964. It has two editions: a fun run for amateur athletes and an elite race for professional athletes. In 2012, the race achieved its historical record of participants, up to 40,000.

It is based upon the Saint Silvester Road Race, a Brazilian race (held since 1925) which spawned numerous other New Year's Eve races. Along with the Madrid Marathon, the San Silvestre Vallecana is one of the city's foremost annual running events.

Past winners

10 km (since 1998)

1964–1997

References

 Volver a resultados. San Silvestre Vallecana. Retrieved on 2022-12-31.
 San Silvestre Vallecana 10 km. Association of Road Racing Statisticians. Retrieved on 2022-12-31.

External links

 Official site of the race  

10K runs
Sports competitions in Madrid
Athletics competitions in Spain
Recurring sporting events established in 1964
December sporting events
New Year celebrations
1964 establishments in Spain